Danijel Mihajlović (born 2 June 1985) is a Serbian footballer.

Statistics

Statistics accurate as of 4 May 2015

Honours
Red Star
Serbian Cup: 2012
Jagodina
Serbian Cup: 2013

References

External links
 Profile and stats at Srbijafudbal
 Danijel Mihajlović Stats at Utakmica.rs

1985 births
Living people
Serbian footballers
FK Jagodina players
Serbian SuperLiga players
Association football defenders
Red Star Belgrade footballers
People from Varvarin
FK Temnić players